Jonathan "Jonny" Fox, better known simply by his stage name Itch, is an English rapper. Fox is the lead vocalist of The King Blues, previously performing briefly as a solo musician during the band's absence.

Early life
Jonathan Fox was born and grew up in South London, England. His mother is from Malaysia. At the age of 13, he was homeless and sold copies of The Big Issue to make some money.

Music career

2004–12: The King Blues

In 2004, Fox released a solo EP under the name The King Blues. However, he began recording with a number of different musicians before settling on a permanent lineup. They initially played in squats around London.

In 2010, Fox collaborated with UK band Faithless on their song "Crazy Bal'heads" for their album The Dance.

In April 2012, the band announced that they would split, with their final album, Long Live the Struggle, to be released months later in July 2012.

2012–2015: Solo career
Soon after The King Blues' breakup, Itch flew to Los Angeles to begin working on solo material with collaborator John Feldmann of Goldfinger. His first solo full-length, The Deep End, released in March 2014 by Red Bull Records, featured guest appearances by Adam Lazzara of Taking Back Sunday, Matisyahu, and Patrick Stump of Fall Out Boy. He began touring extensively, including performances at the Reading and Leeds Festivals and UK dates with Scroobius Pip. Itch fractured his heel during a show at London's Jazz Café in June 2013, and subsequently spent the rest of the summer on Vans Warped Tour in a wheelchair. Itch also played a number of dates on The Kevin Says Tour for Warped Tour UK. Itch, Fruitbag and Jamie Jazz all reunited in May 2014 for a three-song one-off encore after Itch's set at the 100 Club in London. Itch had massive success in Australia where his single "Another Man" was certified double platinum and remained in the top 50 for 14 weeks.

2015–present: Reunion of The King Blues
On 25 November 2015, The King Blues announced their return, as well as announcing tour dates for Enter Shikari, for whom they would appear as special guests on their Mindsweep Tour the following year.

In 2016, the band released "Off with Their Heads" on rapper Scroobius Pip's Speech Development record label.

In 2017, the band signed to Cooking Vinyl Records and released their fifth full-length album The Gospel Truth.

Itch wrote a poem called "Manchester" after the Manchester bombings which was used by ITN News in their report.

Itch released his first book 101 Haikus which was crowd-funded and reached its goal within hours of being announced. The book went on to become an Amazon Best Seller.

In 2019, Itch wrote "38 Minutes" a musical based on a false alert in Hawaii. The live show was sold out months in advance and the soundtrack made the UK iTunes Top 40. 

Itch also released his second book "Tall Stories", a collection of fictional short stories.

Controversy 
In June 2016, during their appearance at the Glastonwick festival (where The King Blues were also playing), The Tuts addressed allegations against Itch. Immediately after the festival they uploaded a video to their YouTube channel, along with the full text of their speech.
 
In July 2019, it was reported that Itch was pursuing legal action to sue the accusers and event promoters. On August 3rd 2021, it was confirmed that the libel case had been settled on mutually acceptable terms without any admissions of liability.  Solidarity Not Silence were represented by Bindmans. Itch represented himself.

Discography

Extended plays
 Manifesto Part 1: How to Fucking Rule at Life (2012)
 Manifesto Part 2: We’re All in the Gutter (2013)

Studio albums

Singles

References

External links
 
 
 

Year of birth missing (living people)
Living people
English male rappers
People from London
Rappers from London